The Great Midwest Relay (a.k.a. GMR) is a two-day, 190 mile relay race, beginning in Madison, Wisconsin and finishing at Chicago's downtown lake-front.

The GMR is one of the longest distance races of its kind in the Midwest. The race course has 36 segments or "legs" created from scenic streets, trails and bike paths of Wisconsin and Illinois. Relay teams of 6-12 people each travel from around the country to participate in the GMR. The relay is open to all skill levels of participants and teams, from serious runners to casual participants and teams simply enjoying the experience.  Portions of the proceeds from the event are donated to the Special Olympics to support their efforts.

In 2008 the relay became the Madison Chicago Relay, or MC200.

References

Long-distance relay races
Foot races in Wisconsin